The Estufa Fria (lit. "Cold Greenhouse") is a greenhouse with three distinct gardens located in Eduardo VII Park between the streets Alameda Engenheiro Edgar Cardoso and Alameda Cardeal Cerejeira in Lisbon, Portugal.

Description 

Measuring  in area, the Estufa Fria consists of three parts: the original Cold Greenhouse (Estufa Fria), Hot Greenhouse (Estufa Quente), and Sweet Greenhouse (Estufa Doce). The term "cold greenhouse" comes from the original building's lack of mechanical heating; instead, wooden slats regulate sunlight and protect the plants from excessively hot or cold temperatures. It is home to azalea and camellia species from around the world.

The Estufa Doce contains cacti and other succulent plants, such as aloe. 

The entire greenhouse complex features small lakes, waterfalls, and sculptures.

History 
The Estufa Fria opened in 1933. Portuguese architect  conceived and designed the project. It was built near an old basalt mine which had been abandoned after a spring was discovered nearby. The greenhouse was remodeled concurrently with Eduardo VII Park in 1945 by Portuguese architect Francisco Keil do Amaral. The greenhouse's existing entrance porch, a lake near the entrance, and a large visitor "living room" called "the ship" or "the vessel" were built during this time.

In 1975 the Estufa Quente and Estufa Doce sections opened, expanding the botanical collection to include plants from tropical and equatorial regions.

On 29 April 2009 the original Estufa Fria closed due to the risk of collapse of its steel structure.  It reopened in April 2011 after two years of renovation work.

References

External links  

 Lisbon Town Hall: Estufa Fria

Buildings and structures in Lisbon
Tourist attractions in Lisbon
Gardens in Portugal
Greenhouses